Barela is a populated place located in Las Animas County, Colorado.
Its elevation is 5,761 feet.

A post office called Barela was established in 1874, and remained in operation until 1931. The community is named after Casimiro Barela, a member of the Colorado General Assembly who co-authored the Constitution of Colorado.

References

Unincorporated communities in Las Animas County, Colorado
Unincorporated communities in Colorado